Arcana is an unincorporated community in Monroe Township, Grant County, Indiana.

History
The name Arcana is likely derived from a Latin word meaning "secluded". The Arcana post office opened in 1858, and was discontinued in 1900.

Geography

References

Unincorporated communities in Grant County, Indiana
Unincorporated communities in Indiana